The 2013 Girls' U16 South American Volleyball Championship was the 2nd edition of the tournament, organised by South America's governing volleyball body, the Confederación Sudamericana de Voleibol (CSV). Held in Popayán, Cauca, Colombia from November 9 to 16, 2013.

Teams

Competition System
All matches in the preliminary round and the semifinals were played best out of three sets, the third place match and the Gold Medal match were played best out of 5 as normal senior tournaments.

The competition system for the second Girls' U16 South American Championship consisted of two rounds, the first round was a Round-Robin system. Each team played once against each of the 7 remaining teams with each team playing two matches in a day against different teams.

According to the final ranking in the first round, the best four teams played in the semifinals (1º VS 4º and 2º VS 3º), the winners played for the Gold Medal while the losers played for the bronze medal.

Matches
All times are Colombia Standard Time (UTC-5)

Standings

|}

First round
The first round matches were divided in two parts, the first part saw the top three teams plus the host (Colombia, Brazil, Peru and Argentina) play the other four teams (Chile, Paraguay, Uruguay and Bolivia), this part was played for two days, the second part had the remaining matches between the groups, this round was played for a day and a half.

Day 1

|}

Day 2

|}

Day 3

|}

Day 4

|}

Final round

5th/8th classification

|}

|}

Championship bracket

Semifinals

|}

Bronze Medal match

|}

Gold Medal match

|}

Final standing

Individual awards

Most Valuable Player
 
Best Middle Blockers
 
 
Best Opposite
 

Best Setter
 
Best Outside Hitters
 
 
Best Libero

References

Women's South American Volleyball Championships
S
Volleyball
International volleyball competitions hosted by Colombia
Youth volleyball